Provincial elections were held in the Pakistani province of Balochistan on 25 July 2018. Newly formed Balochistan Awami Party (BAP) emerged as the largest party by winning 24 seats followed by Muttahida Majlis-e-Amal who won 10 seats. Pakistan Tehreek-e-Insaf won 7 seats for the very first time.

Background
The 2013 elections resulted in a hung assembly, before Pakistan Muslim League (N), National Party, and Pashtunkhwa Milli Awami Party joined hands to form a coalition government. A power-sharing agreement was also brokered between PML-N and NP where the province's Chief Ministership tenure would be bifurcated between the two parties. In consequence, NP's Abdul Malik Baloch served as chief minister from 2013 to 2015 before he was replaced by PML-N's Sanaullah Khan Zehri at the end of 2015.

However, Zehri couldn't complete his term as on 2 January 2018, a number of dissident members from the ruling PML-N colluded with opposition lawmakers to submit a no-confidence motion against him. Seeing that he has lost the majority of the house's support in the ensuing turmoil, Zehri resigned from his post before a no-confidence vote could take place. Pakistan Muslim League (Q)'s, Abdul Quddus Bizenjo, an opposition lawmaker and one of the leaders of the no-confidence bloc, was elected as the province's 15th Chief Minister. He secured 41 of the 65 votes.

This in-house change was also important in the lead-up to the 2018 Senate elections as the bloc managed to secure 6 of the 12 seats for the province, with no seat for PML-N. Further down the line, the group was also successful in making an alliance with Pakistan Tehreek-e-Insaf and Pakistan Peoples Party for the election of the Senate chairman, leading to their combined candidate from Balochistan, Sadiq Sanjrani, being elected to the post.

On 29 March 2018, Anwaar-ul-Haq Kakar and Saeed Hashmi, with the support of Bizenjo, launched a new political party by the name of Balochistan Awami Party (BAP). It was composed of independent candidates, dissident PML-N lawmakers as well as PML-Q members

Pre-election violence 
On 13 July, a suicide bombing killed at least 131 people including BAP candidate for Balochistan Assembly,  Nawabzada Siraj Raisani and over 200 injured.

Results

Party wise

Constituency wise

See also
2018 Pakistani general election
Punjab Provincial Election, 2018
Sindh Provincial Election, 2018
Khyber Pakhtunkhwa Provincial Election, 2018

References

2018 elections in Pakistan
2018